Pixar Animation Studios is an American CGI film production company based in Emeryville, California, United States. Pixar has produced 26 feature films, which were all released by Walt Disney Studios Motion Pictures through the Walt Disney Pictures banner, with their first being Toy Story (which was also the first feature-length CGI film ever released) on November 22, 1995, and their latest being Lightyear on June 17, 2022. 

Their upcoming slate of films includes Elemental (2023), Elio and Inside Out 2 (both 2024), an untitled film in 2025 and two untitled films in 2026.

Films

Released

Upcoming

Unspecified films with dates
These films are unspecified but have confirmed dates from The Walt Disney Studios.

In-development projects
In February 2023, Disney CEO Bob Iger announced that a fifth Toy Story film is in development.

In addition, Enrico Casarosa, Aphton Corbin, Brian Fee, Kristen Lester, Domee Shi and Rosana Sullivan have been working on their respective untitled feature films.

Production cycle
In July 2013, Pixar Studios President Edwin Catmull said that the studio planned to release one original film each year, and a sequel every other year, as part of a strategy to release "one and a half movies a year." On July 3, 2016, Pixar president Jim Morris announced that the studio might be moving away from sequels after Toy Story 4 and Pixar was only developing original ideas with five films in development at the time of the announcement.

Cancelled projects

Monkey 
Back when Pixar was still a part of Lucasfilm in 1985, they started pre-production on a film called Monkey. After they spun off as a new company in 1986, they were still working on it. In the end, they realized they had to abandon it because of technical limitations.

The Yellow Car 
In 1995, Jorgen Klubien started writing a script for a film titled The Yellow Car. He wrote the first draft of the script with Joe Ranft. Then in 1998, the film was scrapped in favor of Toy Story 2'''s 1999 release. The Yellow Car would eventually be reworked into Cars in 2001 then released in 2006.

 1906 
In 2005, Pixar began collaborating with Disney and Warner Bros. on a live-action film adaptation of James Dalessandro's novel 1906, with Brad Bird announced as the director. It would have marked Pixar's first involvement in a live-action production and their first collaboration with a major production company other than Disney. Disney and Pixar left the project due to script problems and an estimated budget of $200 million, and it is in limbo at Warner Bros. However, in June 2018, Bird mentioned the possibility of adapting the novel as a TV series, and the earthquake sequence as a live-action feature film.

 Newt 
A Pixar film titled Newt (which was set to be directed by Gary Rydstrom) was announced in April 2008, with Pixar planning to release it in 2011, which was later delayed to 2012, but it had finally been canceled by early 2010. John Lasseter noted that the film's proposed plot line was similar to another film, Blue Sky Studios' Rio, which was released in 2011. In a March 2014 interview, Pixar president Edwin Catmull stated that Newt was an idea that was not working in pre-production. When the project was passed to Pete Docter, the director of Monsters, Inc. and Up, he pitched an idea that Pixar thought was better, and that concept became Inside Out.

 ShadeMaker 
In 2010, Henry Selick formed a joint venture with Pixar called Cinderbiter Productions, which was to exclusively produce stop-motion films. Its first project under the deal, a film titled ShadeMaker was set to be released on October 4, 2013, but was canceled in August 2012 due to creative differences. Selick was given the option to shop ShadeMaker (now titled The Shadow King) to other studios. Selick later stated in interviews that the film suffered from interference from John Lasseter who Selick claimed came in and constantly changed elements of the script and production that ended up balooning the budget that would lead to its cancelation.

 The Graveyard Book 

In April 2012, Walt Disney Pictures acquired the rights and hired Henry Selick, director of The Nightmare Before Christmas and the film adaptation of Gaiman's novel Coraline, to direct The Graveyard Book. The film was moved to Pixar as a stop-motion production, which would have been the company's first adapted work. After the studio and Selick parted ways over scheduling and development, it was announced in January 2013 that Ron Howard would direct the film. In July 2022, it was announced that Marc Forster will direct the adaptation with a screenplay by David Magee under Walt Disney Studios.

 Circle Seven Animation projects 
In addition, when the now-defunct Circle Seven Animation was open, there were plans for sequels to Finding Nemo (for which Pixar made their own sequel, Finding Dory) and Monsters, Inc. (for which Pixar made a prequel, Monsters University), as well as a different version of Toy Story 3. Pixar's later sequels had no basis in Circle Seven's projects, and were created completely separately.

Co-productionBuzz Lightyear of Star Command: The Adventure Begins is an animated direct-to-video film and a spin-off of the Toy Story franchise produced by Walt Disney Television Animation with an opening sequence created by Pixar. The film was released on August 8, 2000, and led to a television series called, Buzz Lightyear of Star Command with Pixar creating the CGI portion of the opening theme.A Spark Story is a feature-length documentary film co-produced by Pixar, Disney+, and Supper Club. The film centers on directors Aphton Corbin and Louis Gonzales as they work to bring their SparkShorts projects Twenty Something and Nona to the screen.

Collaboration
Pixar assisted in the English localization of several Studio Ghibli films, mainly those from Hayao Miyazaki.

Pixar was brought on board to fine tune the script of The Muppets. The film was released on November 23, 2011.

Pixar assisted with the story development for The Jungle Book, as well as providing suggestions for the film's end credits sequence. The film was released on April 15, 2016. Additional special thanks credit was given to Mark Andrews.Mary Poppins Returns includes a sequence combining live-action and traditional hand-drawn animation. The animation was supervised by Ken Duncan and James Baxter. Over 70 animators specializing in hand-drawn 2D animation from Pixar and Walt Disney Animation Studios were recruited for the sequence. The film was released on December 19, 2018.

Related productionsPlanes is a spin-off of the Cars franchise, produced by the now-defunct DisneyToon Studios and co-written and executive produced by John Lasseter. The film was conceived from the short film Air Mater, which introduces aspects of Planes and ends with a hint of the film. It was released on August 9, 2013. A sequel, Planes: Fire & Rescue, was released on July 18, 2014. A Planes spin-off film was announced in July 2017, with a release date of April 12, 2019, but was removed from the release schedule on March 1, 2018. The film was eventually canceled when DisneyToon Studios was shut down on June 28, 2018.Ralph Breaks the Internet, produced by Walt Disney Animation Studios and co-executive produced by Lasseter, features Kelly Macdonald reprising her role as Merida from Brave, as well as a cameo from Tim Allen reprising his role as Buzz Lightyear from the Toy Story franchise, and a sample of Patrick Doyle's score from Brave''. The film, released on November 21, 2018, also features many visual references to Pixar and its films. Additionally, Andrew Stanton received a "Narrative Guru" credit.

Reception

Box office

Critical and public response

Academy Awards

See also
 List of Pixar shorts
 List of computer-animated films
 List of Disney theatrical animated feature films
 List of Walt Disney Animation Studios films
 List of 20th Century Studios theatrical animated feature films
 List of Blue Sky Studios productions

References

External links
 

Films
Pixar
Lists of films by studio
American films by studio
Pixar
Walt Disney Pictures animated films

el:Pixar Animation Studios#Ταινίες